Mosaic Music Festival was an annual 10-day-long music festival in Singapore that featured both local and overseas acts. From 2005-2014, the festival showcased a variety of music genres, ranging from indie-folk to hip-hop. It aimed to provide a platform for interaction between Singapore and International artists. The performances were held at various venues at the Esplanade - Theatres on the Bay.

History
Launched by the Esplanade in 2005, the festival has since garnered good reviews in regional newspapers such as Thailand's The Nation, Hong Kong's South China Morning Post and Malaysia's The Star. The 10-day fiesta in March 2007, drew about 90,000 people, compared to last year's 80,000 and 2005's 60,000. The Festival featured over 100 performances and 60 percent of those were free. Headline international acts include singer songwriters Rachael Yamagata, jazz band Duke Ellington Orchestra, blues group Buddy Guy and rock musicians Yo La Tengo. - CNA/ms Since its inception three years ago, Mosaic has become an anticipated event in the annual music calendar. Audiences started enquiring about tickets to this third festival as early as October the previous year.

—J P Nathan, Director of Programming

After 10 years, the Esplanade retired the Mosaic Music Festival in 2014, although ad-hoc concerts will still be held under the Mosaic brand.

Programme
The team behind Mosaic expanded its jazz and world-music repertoire to include folk and rock acts.
The aim is to cater to all age groups with a range of music, from experimental to jazz to classical.
And it is not just about showcasing the music; the Esplanade also hopes to provide opportunities for audiences to get to know the artists and their personalities. What started out in 2005 as a soul and jazz-themed event which attracted an older crowd, now boasts a broader range of genres, including indie-folk, folk rock, Afrobeat, ska, pop and R&B that is sure to entertain and give youths an all-rounded immersion into musical culture. With a line-up of some 400 artistes from 17 countries, the Festival in March 2007 sure was a lively one.

The festival includes a programme of free music both indoors and outdoors at the Music Station. Both local band such as Beat Lab and Gan Ainm play for the crowds strolling the esplanade as well as regional bands such as Dina (Malaysia) and Tofu (Indonesia). Another new feature is concerts at the 11th hour. This is the first time performances are going to be staged so late - an hour before midnight. The idea behind this, say organisers, is to throw a regular schedule out of whack. The introduction of the 11th hour segment, which saw 11pm performances at the Esplanade's concert hall, featuring the likes of American singer-songwriter Rickie Lee Jones and Swedish singer-songwriter Jose Gonzalez, drew some groans from audiences who had to stay past their bedtime.

--Mr Nathan

Venues

Heineken Music Club
The Heineken Music Club is a popular venue at Esplanade’s annual Mosaic Music Festival. Known for its intimate, personal setting (capacity of approximately 220) the Heineken Music Club has enjoyed near sold-out performances since 2007. The venue provides a unique setting for audiences to get closer to world-class cutting edge music from around the globe.

The Heineken Music Club is presented by international premium beer Heineken as part of its ongoing sponsorship of the Mosaic Music Festival. A pioneer in the Singapore music scene since 2000, Heineken has also been an avid supporter of some of Singapore’s most renowned international music events including ZoukOut, WOMAD, Good Vibrations Festival and F1 Rocks.

Heineken Green Room Membership Privileges
Heineken Green Room members enjoy special perks and privileges at the Heineken Music Club, giving them an opportunity to get even closer to their favourite artists. These include meet and greet sessions with some of the most popular artists as well as the opportunity to win tickets to performances at the Heineken Music Club.

Previous Heineken Music Club Highlights
2010 - Featured acts included Breakestra, Au Revoir Simone, The Go! Team and Karsh Kale & MIDIVal Punditz. Heineken Green Room members were able to attend meet and greet sessions with artists such as Au Revoir Simone and Breakestra.
2009 - Music enthusiasts were treated to a diverse line-up of music acts, from the quirky musical style of Psapp, to the silky and enticing voice of the UK’s SKYE, as well as the electro-pop sounds of Montreal. Some of the Heineken Green Room member privileges included an exclusive dinner with of Montreal and a meet-the-artist session with Psapp and SKYE. 
2008 - Guests at the Heineken Music Club grooved to the performances of the UK’s electronica band Fujiya & Miyagi, dubstep duo Kode9 and the Spaceape and the simply captivating electro indie-pop tunes of the bird and the bee.
Heineken Green Room members had the chance to win special invitations to performances at the Heineken Music Club while some members also had the opportunity to attend a closed-door All Stars party with the bird and the bee.
2007 - As part of the debut of the Heineken Music Club, audiences were treated to preview performances by folk-jazz guitarist Terry Callier and soul songstress Carleen Anderson and the ‘celestial’, ‘ethereal’ and ‘lustrous’ The Album Leaf.

External links
 Official Mosaic Website
 Official Heineken Singapore Website
 Mosaic Music Festival

References

Music festivals in Singapore